The Old People is a 2011 Bolivian drama film directed by Martín Boulocq.

Cast
 Andrea Camponovo as Ana
 Fabricio Camponovo as Fabricio
 Roberto Guilhon as Tono
 Julio Iglesias as Tio Mario

References

External links
 

2011 films
Bolivian drama films
2010s Spanish-language films
2011 drama films